Viktor Stulikov (born 5 March 1954) is a Russian former swimmer. He competed in two events at the 1972 Summer Olympics for the Soviet Union.

References

External links
 

1954 births
Living people
Russian male swimmers
Olympic swimmers of the Soviet Union
Swimmers at the 1972 Summer Olympics
Place of birth missing (living people)
Soviet male swimmers